The Las Sierras Formation is a geologic formation in Nicaragua. It preserves fossils dating back to the Pleistocene period.

Fossil content 
 Procyonidae indet.
 Proboscidea indet.

See also 
 List of fossiliferous stratigraphic units in Nicaragua

References

Further reading 
 S. G. Lucas, R. Garcia, E. Espinoza, G. E. Alvarado, L. H de Mendoza and E. Vega. 2008. The fossil mammals of Nicaragua. New Mexico Museum of Natural History and Science Bulletin 44:417-429

Geologic formations of Nicaragua
Pleistocene Nicaragua
Paleontology in Nicaragua
Formations